</noinclude>

Classical Newar (Modern: पुलां भाय्, Classical: पुलाङ्गु नेपाल भाय्), also known as Old Newar or Classical Nepal Bhasa, is the pre-1850 literary form of Nepal Bhasa. It is an important source language for historians and linguists. The classical Newari language has also been considered a hybrid in which an extensive Sanskrit superstrate was grafted on to the Tibeto-Burman base.

Ancient era

The earliest known (dated) document in Nepal Bhasa is called "The Palmleaf from Uku Bahal" which dates back to 1114 AD (235 NS).

chīna ḍhākō tr̥saṃghaṣa paribhōga, chu pulēṃga kītya bipāra vastra bivu mikhā tivu maduguna chu sāta dugunava lhai.
which is a general discussion of business transactions. This document dates from the Licchavi period. Hence, it can be inferred that although the official language of the period was Sanskrit, Nepal Bhasa was already in use.

Medieval era

The language continued growing in the Medieval period, and enjoyed royal patronage. Noted royal writers include Mahindra Malla, Siddhinarsingh Malla, Jagatprakash Malla etc. An example of the language used in that period is provided by lines of Mooldevshashidev written by Jagatprakash Malla

धु छेगुकि पाछाव वाहान
तिलहित बिया हिङ लाहाति थाय थायस
()

which is a description of Shiva, and the use of a tiger skin as a seat for Shiva.

The language replaced Sanskrit as the administrative language during this period.

History
This language was the official language of Nepal from Licchavi era to Malla era of Nepal.

ISO
Classical Nepal Bhasa was introduced in ISO 639-2 code list in 2004.

References

Newar
Newar language
Languages attested from the 12th century